Charles Richard Wilson (born 17 January 1978) is an English singer-songwriter, artist and the frontman of five-piece band Kaiser Chiefs. Before the formation of the band, in 2003, Wilson was a member of the band Runston Parva (later known as Parva), which consisted of members of Kaiser Chiefs. On 19 September 2013, Wilson was confirmed as a coach on The Voice UK. He was the winning coach for both the fourth and fifth series of the show, being the first coach to win two years consecutively. Wilson left the show after three series, following the show's move to ITV.

Early life
Wilson was born in Keighley, West Yorkshire to Glynne and TV producer, Geoff Wilson. He has one brother, James.

He attended Leeds Grammar School after Ghyll Royd primary school, and later attended Leeds Metropolitan University and completed his BA (Hons) degree in Graphic Arts and Design in 2000 before undertaking his master's degree in Art and Design. He then taught at Leeds College of Art and Design for a year before the band's big break.

Career 
Wilson, with Nick Hodgson and Andrew White, formed the band Runston Parva. After the group failed to land a record deal, the band re-formed as Parva, with their old friends, Simon Rix and Nick Baines, joining the group, following their return from university. The band landed a record deal; they were later dropped following the closure of Mantra Recordings. They had just recently released their debut album 22 and their first three singles.

Following this, the group decided to reform for the third time, with intentions to sign a new long-term record label and release new musical material, now named Kaiser Chiefs. Their name was adapted from the South African football team Kaizer Chiefs. James Sandom became their new manager and they soon signed a recording contract with B-Unique Records.

In 2023, Wilson took place on series 4 of The Masked Singer as "Phoenix", where he finished in second place.

Outside music

The Voice UK 
On 19 September 2013, Wilson confirmed he would replace Danny O'Donoghue as a coach on the third series of The Voice UK alongside will.i.am, Tom 
Jones, and fellow new coach Kylie Minogue, who replaced Jessie J. During the series, Katy B appeared as Wilson's team mentor. For the fourth series, Wilson appeared alongside Tom Jones, will.i.am and Rita Ora. He was named the winning coach during the 4 April 2015 live final when Stevie McCrorie won the public vote. The following year, he again appeared alongside will.i.am with new coaches, Boy George and Paloma Faith. On 9 April 2016, he became winning coach for the second time when Kevin Simm won the fifth series. The final pitted Team Ricky against Team Ricky with both of Wilson's acts knocking the other coaches out of the live final. The win made him the Voice UK coach with the most wins. He left the show prior to its move to ITV.

Media work

Wilson has twice been a guest on the BBC Two television show, Never Mind the Buzzcocks, firstly in 2005 as a panellist and then as a guest host in 2006. He also featured on the panel of the BBC Television comedy series, Shooting Stars, in 2009. In 2008, he appeared in Peter Kay's talent show parody, Peter Kay's Britain's Got the Pop Factor... and Possibly a New Celebrity Jesus Christ Soapstar Superstar Strictly on Ice, in a duet with the show's protagonist, Geraldine McQueen. Wilson had a minor role in St Trinian's 2: The Legend of Fritton's Gold, as the rock star boyfriend of Sarah Harding's character, Roxy. Wilson stated on his Radio X show that he was cast to appear in Harry Potter and the Deathly Hallows – Part 1 fronting a wizard band made up of actual musicians. When the band was replaced with CGI instruments, he was invited instead to appear in a background role. It is popularly believed that he had a cameo as Dirk Cresswell, but Wilson himself has denied this, saying the character identified as Dirk is in fact played by an unnamed actor. Between November 2012 and January 2013, Wilson took on the role of the Artilleryman in the staged musical, Jeff Wayne's Musical Version of The War of the Worlds – The New Generation. Wilson and Kaiser Chiefs bassist Simon Rix wrote and performed the theme tune for Zig and Zag. Wilson joined new radio station Radio X in September 2015 where he presented the Sunday morning show from 11am to 2pm.  He left in 2017 due to other commitments

In October 2015, Wilson became the host of Sky 1's music and comedy panel show Bring the Noise. He appeared on the show opposite former The X Factor judge and the Pussy Cat Dolls singer Nicole Scherzinger, stand-up comedian Joel Dommett, rapper Tinie Tempah and comedian Katherine Ryan. However, in April 2016, it was announced that the show had been cancelled after just one series due to declining ratings.

In 2017, he appeared as a guest on The Grand Tour, a motoring programme presented by Jeremy Clarkson, Richard Hammond and James May.

In 2018, Ricky became patron of MAS Records, part of Kidderminster College, alongside Robert Plant.

In 2020, Wilson launched a new series of podcasts with veteran English DJ Tony Blackburn entitled Ricky and Tony's Pop Detectives. In the series Wilson and Blackburn try to ascertain whether or not long rumoured myths and claims surrounding pop stars lives and their music are true. The series launched to positive reviews and a second series was released later in the year.

In 2020, Wilson used his art skills to present an art episode of CBBC series Celebrity Supply Teacher.

In 2021, he went on to host his own series on CBBC, Ricky Wilson’s Art Jam. The same year Wilson was also cast as the narrator in the UK animated show Dodo. Also in this year, BBC Radio 2 gave him his own series called Ricky Wilson's Rock And Roll Classics, which ran for two series in 2021 and 2022, and which featured Wilson playing his favourite songs from the 1950s and early 60s.

In 2022, making use of his art background further he co-presented CBBC series Britain’s Best Young Artist alongside Vick Hope.

He became the host of the Virgin Radio UK Drivetime show on 9th January 2023.

Personal life
During the early days of Kaiser Chiefs, Wilson was well known for wearing stripy blazers, waistcoats, turn-up jeans, and winkle picker shoes, a style that won him the Shockwaves NME Award For Best Dressed Person in 2006. Lately, he has adopted a more casual dress code. Wilson is well known for his energetic stage presence, climbing scaffolding, standing on the safety barrier, and at times crowd surfing. Of crowd surfing, Wilson says he likes to "get out and see the crowd, see what they smell like". Such exploits have occasionally resulted in injury, such as torn ankle ligaments after jumping off stage during a concert in Portugal.

In May 2006, Wilson was involved in a hit-and-run accident in Leeds. He was hit by a car while attempting to walk on a pedestrian crossing, suffering bruising and a broken toe owing to a 'Ricky trademark jump' which resulted in him hitting the windscreen and being flipped over the top of the vehicle rather than trapped underneath.

Wilson began a relationship with celebrity stylist Grace Zito in early 2015. They became engaged in April 2018 and married in June 2021.

Wilson and the band are supporters of Amnesty International and Nordoff-Robbins music therapy.

Filmography

References

External links

KaiserChiefs.com
Gigshot.co.uk – Kaiser Chiefs at Paradiso Amsterdam, 29 May 2007
NME.com – ShockWaves NME Awards 2006: Full list of winners
NME.com – Kaiser Chiefs' Ricky Wilson: 'I turned down the chance to be a judge on "The Voice"'
NME.com – Kaiser Chief's Ricky Wilson opens up about his role in 'The War Of The Worlds'

1978 births
Living people
English songwriters
English male singers
English rock singers
British indie rock musicians
Kaiser Chiefs members
Ivor Novello Award winners
People from Keighley
Alumni of Leeds Beckett University
Academics of Leeds Arts University
Musicians from Bradford